The Netherlands Football League Championship 1898–1899 was contested by twelve teams participating in two divisions. The national champion would be determined by a play-off match featuring the winners of the eastern and western football division of the Netherlands. RAP won this year's championship by beating PW Enschede 3-2 and 2–1.

New entrants
Eerste Klasse East:
Koninklijke UD
Quick Nijmegen

Eerste Klasse West:
Koninklijke HFC returned after one season of absence

Divisions

Eerste Klasse East

Eerste Klasse West

Championship play-off

RAP won the championship.

References
RSSSF Netherlands Football League Championships 1898-1954
RSSSF Eerste Klasse Oost
RSSSF Eerste Klasse West

Netherlands Football League Championship seasons
1898 in Dutch sport
1899 in Dutch sport